The Peterborough & District Football League is a football competition in England. It has a total of six divisions, the highest of which, the Premier Division, sits at step 7 of the National League System (level 11 of the English football league system). It is a feeder to the United Counties League Division One.

For the 2022–23 season there are 138 teams competing in the league, which, under the terms of a sponsorship agreement, is known as the Dor-Jan Windows & Doors Peterborough & District Football League.

In 2005–06 the PDFL introduced 'combination leagues' for Reserve and 'A' teams. These divisions were scrapped after the 2010-11 season and the league went back to six ordinary divisions named Premier Division, Division One, Division Two, Division Three, Division Four and Division Five. The league also introduced a Veterans Section in 2012 and a Walking football division in 2020.

2022–23 Members

Premier Division

Division One

Division Two

Division Three

Division Four

Veterans Premier Division

Veterans East Division

Veterans West Division

Veterans Central Division

Walking Football Division One
Boston United Community Walking
Harborough Town Juniors Walking
Netherton United Adult Walking 1
Norwich Community Sports Foundation
Oakham United Walking
South Lincs Steelers Walking

Walking Football Division Two
Glinton & Northborough
Hampton
Harborough Town Juniors Walking
Huntingdonshire Walking Football Club
Netherton United Adult Walking 2
Whittlesey Athletic Walking Burt

Sunday Division One
Brotherhood
Cardea Sunday
Dragonfly
Enfield Dons
Park Farm Pumas Sunday
WestRaven
Whaplode Drove Rovers Sunday
Whittlesey Athletic Sunday

Sunday Division Two
Cardea Reserves Sunday
Glinton & Northborough Sunday
March Town United Youth Sunday
Netherton United Sunday
Netherton United Sunday Reserves
PSV Athletic
PSV Rangers
Peterborough Saints
Stanground Eagles
Thorpe Wood Rangers Sunday

Past winners

Champions

Veterans Champions

PFA Senior Cup
1995–96 Ortonians
1996–97 Deeping Rangers
1997–98 Wisbech Town Reserves
1998–99 Perkins Sports
1999–2000 Oundle Town
2000–01 Eye United
2001–02 Eye United
2002–03 Eye United
2003–04 Ortonians
2004–05 Ortonians
2005–06 Deeping Sports
2006–07 Alconbury
2007–08 Perkins Sports
2008–09 Rutland Rangers
2009–10 Rutland Rangers
2010–11 Moulton Harrox
2011–12 Pinchbeck United
2012–13 Moulton Harrox
2013–14 ICA Sports
2014–15 Coates Athletic
2015-16 Whittlesey Athletic
2016-17 ICA Sports
2017-18 Netherton United
2018-19 Whittlesey AThletic
2019-20 Void
2020-21 Uppingham Town

References
The league tables of the Peterborough & District Football League 1902–2006 (Bob Perkins)

External links
 Official site

 
Sport in Peterborough
Football leagues in England
Football in Cambridgeshire